LGSM may refer to:

 the ICAO code for Samos International Airport
 Lesbians and Gays Support the Miners
Licentiate of the Guildhall School of Music